Denezhkin is a Russian masculine surname, its feminine counterpart is Denezhkina. It may refer to
Alexander Denezhkin (born 1991), Russian ice hockey player
Irina Denezhkina (born 1981), Russian writer

See also
Denezhkin Kamen Nature Reserve in Russia

Russian-language surnames